Ischnurges illustralis is a moth of the family Crambidae. The species was first described by Julius Lederer in 1863. It is known from Australia and New Guinea.

References

Moths described in 1863
Spilomelinae